Zac Dalpe (born November 1, 1989) is a Canadian professional ice hockey centre who currently plays for the Florida Panthers in the National Hockey League (NHL). Drafted 45th overall by the Carolina Hurricanes in 2008, Dalpe played in the British Columbia Hockey League and Central Collegiate Hockey Association before turning professional.

Playing career

Minor Hockey
Dalpe grew up playing minor hockey in his hometown of Paris, Ontario for the Paris Wolfpack of the Ontario Minor Hockey Association (OMHA)'s Southern Counties League.  He later played for the Brantford 99'ers AAA club in Western Ontario's Pavilion League. In 2004-05, Dalpe advanced to the AAA Minor Midget level for the 99'ers.

Listed in his Ontario Hockey League (OHL) draft year at just 5'5" and 115 lbs., Dalpe went unselected in the 2005 OHL Priority Selection and returned to play AAA Major Midget in 2005-06.

Junior and College
After playing Major Midget, Dalpe signed with the Stratford Cullitons Junior B club of the Midwestern Ontario Hockey League for 2006-07.  The following year, Dalpe headed to Western Canada and signed with the British Columbia Hockey League's Penticton Vees Junior A club in 2007-08.

After that season, Dalpe was drafted in the 2nd round (26th overall) of the 2008 OHL Priority Draft by the Plymouth Whalers. That same year, he was selected by the Carolina Hurricanes (2nd round, 45th overall) in the 2008 NHL Entry Draft.

Dalpe did not play for Plymouth or Carolina (Hurricanes/River Rats/Checkers) that year. Instead, he chose to accept an NCAA scholarship at Ohio State University for the 2008-09 campaign. He played for the Buckeyes for two seasons before  making the jump to professional hockey.

Professional
Dalpe played in his first NHL game on October 7, 2010, after impressing the Hurricanes during training camp and surviving several rounds of cuts. Dalpe recorded an assist in the game for his first NHL point.  He scored his first NHL goal on January 1, 2011 against Johan Hedberg of the New Jersey Devils. Prior to the start of the 2013–14 season Dalpe, along with Jeremy Welsh, was traded to the Vancouver Canucks in exchange for Kellan Tochkin and a fourth round selection in the 2014 NHL Draft.

On July 13, 2014, Dalpe signed a one-year free agent contract with the Buffalo Sabres.

Dalpe was not tendered a qualifying offer by the Sabres, and on the first day of free agency signed a one-year, two way contract with the Minnesota Wild on July 1, 2015. He scored his first goal for the Wild as their only goal on April 9, 2016 against Niklas Backstrom of the Calgary Flames.

Dalpe made the Wild's opening night roster for the 2016–17 season, appearing in 9 games for 3 points before suffering a knee injury, requiring surgery, against the Dallas Stars on October 30, 2016. Upon his return to health, Dalpe was reassigned to AHL affiliate, the Iowa Wild, before suffering a second knee injury. On February 27, 2017, Dalpe was placed on waivers; he was claimed by the Columbus Blue Jackets. He was immediately reassigned to the AHL to play with the Jackets' affiliate, the Cleveland Monsters.

On June 9, 2017, the Blue Jackets re-signed Dalpe to a two-year, two-way contract extension. Dalpe started the 2017–18 season on the Blue Jackets' NHL roster before he was later returned to the Monsters after 12 games.

During the 2018–19 season, while leading the Cleveland Monsters in goals and points, Dalpe was signed to a two-year, two-way extension to remain with the Blue Jackets on February 27, 2019.

After five seasons within the Blue Jackets organization, on July 30, 2021, Dalpe left the club as a free agent and signed a two-year, two-way contract with the Florida Panthers, marking a return to play with affiliate and former AHL club, the Charlotte Checkers.

Career statistics

Awards and honours

References

External links

1989 births
Albany River Rats players
Buffalo Sabres players
Canadian ice hockey centres
Carolina Hurricanes draft picks
Carolina Hurricanes players
Charlotte Checkers (2010–) players
Cleveland Monsters players
Columbus Blue Jackets players
Florida Panthers players
Ice hockey people from Ontario
Iowa Wild players
Living people
Minnesota Wild players
Ohio State Buckeyes men's ice hockey players
Penticton Vees players
Rochester Americans players
Sportspeople from the County of Brant
Utica Comets players
Vancouver Canucks players
AHCA Division I men's ice hockey All-Americans